Dionne Tonna (born 26 September 1983) is a Maltese former footballer who played as a midfielder. She has been a member of the Malta women's national team playing 25 games after missing 8 years of football through injury. 
Following her retirement from a playing career, she has studied her coaching licences and now forms part of the National Women Team as an Assistant Coach.

References

1983 births
Living people
Women's association football midfielders
Maltese women's footballers
Malta women's international footballers
Hibernians F.C. players